HMS Camellia  may refer to one of two ships of the Royal Navy named after Camellia, the genus of flowering plants:

 , an  sloop launched in 1915, that served in World War I and was sold in 1923.
 , a  launched in 1940, that served in World War II and was sold in 1946.

Royal Navy ship names